Castle Dor is a 1961 historical novel by Daphne du Maurier (with Sir Arthur Quiller-Couch), set in 19th century Cornwall.

Plot introduction
Castle Dor began life as the unfinished last novel by Sir Arthur Quiller-Couch, the celebrated 'Q', and was passed by his daughter to Daphne du Maurier. The story is based around the legend of Tristan and Iseult, but set in 19th century Cornwall. The main characters are a Breton onion seller, called Amyot Trestane, and the newly-wed Linnet Lewarne.

Real placenames mentioned
 Castle Dore - ancient earthworks near Fowey
 Castle An Dinas ancient earthworks near St Columb Major
 Indian Queens village in St Enoder parish.
 Fowey - renamed Troy 
 Tresaddern - A farm near St Columb Major

References

1961 British novels
Novels by Daphne du Maurier
Novels set in Cornwall
J. M. Dent books
Novels set in the 19th century